Mohamed Ezzarfani (born 15 November 1997), commonly known as Moha, is a Moroccan footballer who plays as a left winger for Spanish club CE Sabadell FC.

Club career
Born in Nador but raised in Martorell, Barcelona, Catalonia, Moha represented CF Martorell, FP Hermes and CF Damm as a youth. On 28 July 2016, after finishing his formation, he joined Segunda División B side CF Badalona.

Moha made his senior debut on 21 August 2016, starting in a 1–0 home win against Lleida Esportiu.

On 17 July 2017, Moha signed a two-year contract with FC Barcelona for a fee of € 10,000; he was initially assigned to the reserves also in the third division. On 11 August, however, he was loaned to fellow league team Hércules CF for one year.

On 30 August 2018, after returning from loan, Moha terminated his contract with Barça, and agreed to a two-year deal with another reserve team, RCD Espanyol B, the following day. The following 24 May, he renewed his contract with the latter until 2022. 

Moha made his first team debut on 28 November 2019, coming on as a second-half substitute for Esteban Granero in a 2–2 away draw against Ferencvárosi TC, for the campaign's UEFA Europa League. He ended the season with one further appearance with the main squad, which suffered relegation, and scored a career-best 13 goals for the B-side.

On 9 September 2020, Moha was loaned to Segunda División side CD Mirandés, for one year. He scored his first professional goal on 29 October, netting the game's only in a home success over Real Zaragoza.

On 6 August 2021, Moha agreed to a contract with Primera División RFEF side CE Sabadell FC.

References

External links

1997 births
Living people
People from Nador
Moroccan footballers
Spanish footballers
Association football wingers
Segunda División players
Segunda División B players
CF Badalona players
FC Barcelona Atlètic players
Hércules CF players
RCD Espanyol B footballers
RCD Espanyol footballers
CD Mirandés footballers
CE Sabadell FC footballers
Moroccan expatriate footballers
Moroccan expatriate sportspeople in Spain
Expatriate footballers in Spain
Expatriate footballers in Iran
Moroccan expatriate sportspeople in Iran
CF Damm players